Elisabeth Catherina Koopmann-Hevelius (in Polish called Elżbieta Heweliusz; January 17, 1647–December 22, 1693) is considered one of the first female astronomers. Originally from Danzig, Poland, she contributed to improve the work and observations done together with her husband Johannes Hevelius.

Early life
Elisabeth Koopmann (or Kaufmann) was, like Hevelius and his first wife, a member of a rich merchant family in the city of Danzig (Gdańsk) located in Pomeranian Voivodeship of the Polish–Lithuanian Commonwealth and a member of the trade organisation called Hansa. Elisabetha Koopman's parents were Nicholas Koopman (the Dutch word for "Merchant") (1601-1672) who was a prosperous merchant and Joanna Mennings (or Menninx) (1602-1679). Nicholas and Joanna were married in Amsterdam in 1633. They moved from Amsterdam to Hamburg then, in 1636, they moved to Danzig. It was in this city, largely German speaking but a part of Poland at the time, that their daughter Elisabetha was born.

Marriage

It was a fascination for astronomy which led Elisabetha, when still only a child, to approach Johannes Hevelius, an astronomer of international repute who had a complex of three houses in Danzig which contained the best observatory in the world. The marriage of the sixteen-year-old to fifty-two-year-old Hevelius in 1663 allowed her also to pursue her own interest in astronomy by helping him manage his observatory. They had a son, who died soon after birth, and three daughters who survived. The eldest of the three daughters was named Catherina Elisabetha (after her mother) and baptized in St Catherine's Church, Danzig, on 14 February 1666. From the writings of Johann III Bernoulli we know that Elisabetha contracted smallpox and was permanently scarred by it. Following his death in 1687, she completed and published Prodromus astronomiae (1690), their jointly compiled catalogue of 1,564 stars and their positions. The work included information on their methods of calculations and examples of how they determined latitude and longitude of stars using the sectant and quadrant. The book, however, was published only with Johannes name as author.

Latin
Scholars know that she wrote in Latin since she had written letters to other scientists in Latin. They wonder why she would have had to learn Latin and why it would have been a priority for her at the time.

Death
Elisabetha Hevelius died in December 1693, at the age of 46, and was buried in the same tomb as her husband. After her death, the mathematician François Arago wrote of her character:

A complimentary remark was always made about Madam Hevelius, who was the first woman, to my knowledge, who was not frightened to face the fatigue of making astronomical observations and calculations.

In Culture
Elisabeth's life was dramatized in the German language historical novel Die Sternjägerin (The Star Huntress)(2006).

The minor planet 12625 Koopman is named in her honour, as is the crater Corpman on Venus.

Notes

References

 Ogilvie, Marilyn Bailey. "Hevelius, Elisabetha Koopman". In: Women in Science, The MIT Press, 1986, p. 99  (Short encyclopedia article)
Walz, E. 2006. The Star Huntress. Random House/Bertelsmann.  (Historical novel)

External links
Hevelius beer festival website
Johann and Elizabeth Hevelius, astronomers of Danzig

1647 births
1693 deaths
17th-century women scientists
Women astronomers
Scientists from Gdańsk
17th-century Polish astronomers